Sarah-Jane Hutt (born 3 October 1964) is a British model and beauty queen who was the fifth Miss United Kingdom to win the Miss World beauty contest in 1983.

She refused to admit she was the most beautiful woman and some of the unhappy contestants agreed with her.

She is a former pupil of the Mountbatten School in Romsey, Hampshire.

References

Miss World winners
Miss World 1983 delegates
Miss United Kingdom winners
Living people
People from Poole
People from Romsey
1964 births
British beauty pageant winners